Thomas Ryan Pressly (born December 15, 1988) is an American professional baseball pitcher for the Houston Astros of Major League Baseball (MLB).  He has also played in MLB for the Minnesota Twins.

Originally selected by the Boston Red Sox in the 11th round of the 2007 MLB draft, Pressly was chosen by the Minnesota Twins in the 2012 Rule 5 draft, and made his MLB debut with the Twins in 2013.  The Twins traded Pressly to Houston in 2018, where he serves as the team's closer.  In 2019, he set a major league record for consecutive scoreless appearances, with 40. He was an MLB All-Star in 2019 and 2021.  During the Astros' World Series championship season in 2022, Pressly closed out two combined no-hitters, including Game 4 of the World Series, just the second no-hitter in World Series history.  He became the first relief pitcher in baseball history to be a part of two combined no-hitters and just the second pitcher to be involved in multiple combined no-hitters after Cristian Javier, his teammate who had started each of the no-hitters. In the postseason, Pressly has eleven saves (all with Houston, a club record), which is tied for fifth most in MLB history.

Early life and amateur career
Pressly was born in Dallas and raised in Irving, Texas. His grandfather, Tito Nicholas, was a personal friend of Tom Landry, the former coach of the Dallas Cowboys. Pressly trained in baseball from a young age, and was coached by retired Major League Baseball (MLB) pitcher Steve Busby.

Pressly attended American Heritage Academy in Carrollton, Texas, for his first three years of high school. He starred as a pitcher and shortstop for the school's baseball team, leading the conference in 23 different offensive categories. In addition to baseball, Pressly played American football as a defensive back. During a football game, he tore the anterior cruciate ligament and medial collateral ligament in his left knee when he was tackled following an interception. His knee required surgery, ending his football career and jeopardizing his baseball career.

As American Heritage considered ending its baseball program, Pressly transferred to Edward S. Marcus High School in Flower Mound, Texas, for his senior year. Pressly committed to attend Texas Tech University after receiving a scholarship to play college baseball for the Red Raiders team.

Professional career

Boston Red Sox (2007–2012)
The Boston Red Sox drafted Pressly in the 11th round, with the 354th overall selection, of the 2007 MLB draft. Pressly signed with Boston for a $100,000 signing bonus rather than attend college. Pressly worked as a starting pitcher for the Red Sox in minor league baseball, but was converted into a relief pitcher in 2012. As a relief pitcher for the Portland Sea Dogs of the Class AA Eastern League, he pitched to a 2.93 earned run average with 21 strikeouts in  innings pitched.

Minnesota Twins (2013–2018)
After the 2012 season, the Minnesota Twins selected Pressly from the Red Sox in the Rule 5 draft. Pressly made the Twins' Opening Day roster. He made his major league debut on April 4, pitching a scoreless inning, in which he struck out Torii Hunter. Pressly appeared in 49 games, going 3–3 with 3.87 ERA and 49 strikeouts in  innings of work.
 
In 2014, Pressly began the season with the Rochester Red Wings, the Twins Triple-A affiliate, before being called up on July 23. He made 25 relief appearances, going 2–0 with a 2.86 ERA. To start the 2015 season, Pressly once again began with Rochester, before being recalled on April 28. On July 4, Pressly suffered a lat muscle strain, putting him on the 15-day disabled list, and after suffering a setback during rehab on August 17, Pressly was ruled out for the remainder of the year. On the season, Pressly made 27 appearances, going 3–2 with a 2.93 ERA.

In 2016, Pressly was primarily used as a middle reliever and setup man. On July 31, Pressly recorded his first major league save in a 6–4 win against the Chicago White Sox. For the year, Pressly appeared in 72 games (4th most in the AL), compiling a 6–7 record with a 3.70 ERA with 67 strikeouts in  innings. In 2017, Pressly remained a middle reliever and setup man. However, through the first 3 months of the season, Pressly struggled, going 1–2 with a 9.50 ERA in just 18 innings. Due to his struggles, Pressly was optioned to the minors on June 6, and was recalled on June 29. After his recall from the minors, Pressly returned to his prior form, compiling a 1–1 with a 2.75 ERA with 35 strikeouts in  innings. For the season, he was 2–3 with a 4.70 ERA in 57 relief appearances.

The 2018 season, continued to maintain his role of middle reliever and setup man. Pressly made 51 appearances, finishing with a 1–1 record with a 3.40 ERA with 69 strikeouts in  innings for the Twins.

Houston Astros

2018–2019
The Twins traded Pressly to the Houston Astros for minor leaguers Jorge Alcalá and Gilberto Celestino on July 27, 2018. In 26 regular season games pitched with the Astros, Pressly posted a 0.77 ERA and walked only three batters. Houston's focus on analytics was largely credited for his post-trade success. The Astros analytics department had noted that Pressly had elite spin rates on his curveball and slider, and recommended that he throw them more often.

Before the 2019 season, Pressly signed a two-year contract extension with the Astros worth $17.5 million. On May 17, Pressly broke Craig Kimbrel's major league record with his 39th consecutive scoreless appearance, dating back to August 10, 2018. The streak reached 40 games before he allowed a run on May 24. For the 2019 season, Pressly was 2–3 with three saves and a 2.32 ERA in 55 relief appearances in which he pitched  innings and struck out 72 batters (11.9 per 9 innings), and tied for the major league lead in holds (31).

2020–2021
In 2020, Pressly was 1–3 with 12 saves (3rd in the AL) and a 3.43 ERA, in 21 innings in which he struck out 29 batters (12.4 per 9 innings) over 23 relief appearances.

Pressly first became Houston's full-time closer in 2021. He was selected for the second time in his Astros tenure for the All-Star Game, played at Coors Field. When his selection was announced, he had not allowed an earned run in 12 consecutive appearances, leading to a 1.54 ERA over 35 innings and a 4–1 record. He tied for first in the AL in save percentage (93.3%), and among relief pitchers in the AL, was third in ERA, fourth in WHIP (0.83) and he had tied for fifth in with 14 saves. On September 23, Pressley completed a scoreless ninth in his 60th appearance of the season to seal a 9–5 victory versus the Los Angeles Angels, concluding the final condition for his contract for 2022 to fully vest, guaranteeing him a $10 million salary. Since being acquired by Houston at the 2018 trade deadline, Pressly had produced a 2.19 ERA, 0.924 WHIP, and saved 42 games in  innings. He had converted 25 of 27 save chances on the season.

In 2021, Pressley went 5–3 with 26 saves, 0.969 WHIP, and a 2.25 ERA. In 64 relief appearances he pitched 64 innings, striking out 81 batters. He produced the lowest walk and home run rates of his career.

2022–present

Pressly and the Astros agreed to terms on a new two-year contract extension on April 5, 2022. With $30 million guaranteed, it covered the 2023 and 2024 seasons, with an option for 2025. Due to a case of knee inflammation, he was placed on the 10-day injured list on April 16.  On May 29, Pressly earned a save after inducing a ground ball hit by Luis Torrens for a game-ending, bases-loaded double play to preserve a 2–1 win versus the Seattle Mariners.

On June 5, Pressly was ejected in the ninth inning after throwing inside to Michael A. Taylor of the Kansas City Royals. On June 23, Pressly gave up four runs in the bottom of the ninth inning to the New York Yankees, including the go-ahead run delivered by Aaron Judge's walk-off single. On June 25, Pressly closed out a combined no-hitter versus the Yankees by earning the save in a 3–0 win. Led by starter Cristian Javier's seven innings, Héctor Neris also pitched in the eighth inning. It was the 14th no-hitter in Astros history, and first at Yankee Stadium since 2003, also an Astros' combined no-hitter.

On July 3, Pressly earned the win (2–2) by closing out a walk-off 4–2 victory over the Los Angeles Angels in which Astros pitchers struck out 20 batters to establish a franchise record in a nine inning contest.  Starter Framber Valdez (first six innings), Neris (7th), and Rafael Montero (8th) all preceded Pressly, who, in the ninth, struck out the side.  On July 17 versus Oakand, Pressly again struck out the side in the ninth inning, which tied the Astros' franchise record with 27 consecutive batters retired by a reliever, first achieved by Dave Giusti in 1965.  Pressly's streak occurred over eight straight outings.  Presley then retired the Mariners in order in the ninth on July 24 to pass Giusti.  In the July 28 game, Presley retired the first two batters in the ninth to reach 32 before surrendering a single to J. P. Crawford, which tied teammate Justin Verlander (2019) for most batters retired in a row among all pitchers in Astros history.

On August 25, the Astros placed Pressly on the 10-day injury due to neck spasms.  On September 9, the Astros activated him from the injured list.  That day, he surrendered a solo home run in the ninth inning to Taylor Ward before closing a 4–3 win over the Angels for the save.  In the season finale versus Philadelphia Philles on October 5, Pressly secured his 33rd save, extending a career-high.  It was his 76th save as an Astro, tying him with Fred Gladding for fourth place.

In 2022, he was 2–2 with 33 saves and a 2.98 ERA in  innings with 65 strikeouts in 50 games.

Closing out Game 4 of the 2022 World Series, Pressly secured the final three outs of a 5–0 combined no-hitter of the Phillies.  Like the no-hit contest in New York, Javier was the starting pitcher.  Bryan Abreu and Rafael Montero both preceded Pressly.  He and Javier became the first to contribute in multiple combined no-hitters in the major leagues, with Pressly being the first reliever to do so.  The third no-hitter in MLB postseason history, it was the second in World Series play, following Don Larsen's perfect game in 1956.

Pressly was critical in the Astros’ victory in the 2022 World Series, closing out five of six games, as he allowed just two hits, one walk, and no earned runs in  innings.  This impressive run included a 5-out save in Game 5, and the final three outs in Game 6 as the Astros clinched the title.  In Game 5, he entered with a 3–2 lead in the eighth, one out and runners on first and third.  He struck out Brandon Marsh on three pitches—all sliders—and induced a sharply-hit Kyle Schwarber groundout that first baseman Trey Mancini smothered.  Per Baseball-Reference.com, the Marsh strikeout rendered 9.2% championship win probability added (cWPA), the most on any single out over the prior six World Series.  For his World Series performance, Pressly led all players in the 2022 edition with a 33.87% cWPA. In total, Pressly went 6-for-6 in postseason saves (while allowing no earned runs) to become the 16th reliever with six postseason saves in one postseason.

International career
On November 10, 2022, Pressly committed to play for the United States in the 2023 World Baseball Classic.

Personal life
Pressly's wife, Kat (née Rogers), is a former Dallas Cowboys Cheerleader. They married on December 31, 2019, in Houston. Their son, Wyatt, was born in August 2021, and their daughter, Hunter, was born in July 2022.

See also

 Houston Astros award winners and league leaders
 List of Houston Astros no-hitters
 List of Major League Baseball no-hitters
 List of people from Dallas
 Rule 5 draft results

References
Footnotes

Sources

External links

1988 births
Living people
American League All-Stars
Baseball players from Dallas
Major League Baseball pitchers
Minnesota Twins players
Houston Astros players
Gulf Coast Red Sox players
Lowell Spinners players
Greenville Drive players
Salem Red Sox players
Portland Sea Dogs players
Surprise Saguaros players
Rochester Red Wings players
Corpus Christi Hooks players
Sugar Land Space Cowboys players
2023 World Baseball Classic players